Tekken was a mobile fighting game in the Tekken series developed and published by Bandai Namco Entertainment. It was released worldwide for Android and iOS on March 1, 2018.  As of February 2019, the game can no longer be played.

Gameplay
Tekken Mobile is a touch based fighting game that incorporates gacha elements. Players select characters to place on a team and face off against a team of opposing characters. The objective is to defeat the opponent by using a collection of "Waza Cards" (a total of nine in one deck), which makes their character use a certain attack depending on the card's color. Each character has an elemental affinity that consists of either earth, fire, water, or lightning. The affinities give either an advantage or disadvantage depending on the matchup.

Players can upgrade their fighters by getting special fragments (common, to rare) which are bought in premium or epic packs using real money.

Characters

Cancellation
The game's servers were abruptly switched off on February 15, 2019, making it no longer playable. Possible reasons for the cancellation was the negative reception of the game's expensive prices, and lack of revenue on the game's part. As a result, the upcoming new character named Taekwondo Girl did not see a release. Fans gave her the name Shuwawei, but is not an official name.
Anyway, the Taekwondo Girl wasn't the only character that got cut. Kazumi Mishima was also planned, but didn't make it into the game before it was canceled. She was given two renders where she was wearing both "Elegant" and "Exotic" customizations in Tekken 7 which was presumably either of these two renders are in 3-Star or 4-Star.

References

External links
 
 

Android (operating system) games
Dinosaurs in video games
2018 video games
Products and services discontinued in 2019
IOS games
Single-player video games
Bandai Namco games
Fighting games
Video games set in China
Video games set in Egypt
Video games set in England
Mobile
Delisted digital-only games